Fallet (The Case) is a Swedish comedy-drama television series, a spoof on the Nordic noir detective genre. It premiered 14 April 2017 on Swedish channel SVT1 before being acquired by Netflix. It is a co-production of SVT, FLX, Film i Väst and DR, supported by Nordisk Film & TV Fond. The series stars Lisa Henni as Sophie Borg and Adam Godley as DCI Tom Brown, two mediocre detectives who pair up to investigate a murder.

In November 2017, Fallet was named best comedy drama at C21's International Drama Awards in London. American cable network Showtime is developing a remake from Shameless writer Etan Frankel.

Synopsis
Incompetent detectives Sophie Borg from Stockholm and Tom Brown from St Ives, United Kingdom are given one last chance to solve a case after the macabre murder of an Englishman in Borg's fictionalized hometown of Norrbacka. 
Norrbacka police chief Klas Wall, who is about to retire, is overjoyed at the excitement of the case.

Cast

See also 
Scandinavian noir

References

External links
Fallet at SVT

2017 Swedish television series debuts
Swedish crime television series
Swedish comedy television series
Television shows set in Sweden
Police procedural television series
Sveriges Television comedy shows